Events from the year 1993 in the United States.

Incumbents

Federal government 
 President: George H. W. Bush (R-Texas) (until January 20), Bill Clinton (D-Arkansas) (starting January 20)
 Vice President: Dan Quayle (R-Indiana) (until January 20), Al Gore (D-Tennessee) (starting January 20)
 Chief Justice: William Rehnquist (Wisconsin)
 Speaker of the House of Representatives: Tom Foley (D-Washington)
 Senate Majority Leader: George J. Mitchell (D-Maine)
 Congress: 102nd (until January 3), 103rd (starting January 3)

Events

January 

 January 3 – In Moscow, George H. W. Bush and Boris Yeltsin sign the second Strategic Arms Reduction Treaty.
 January 5
The state of Washington executes Westley Allan Dodd by hanging (the first legal hanging in America since 1965).
$7,400,000 USD is stolen from Brinks Armored Car Depot in Rochester, New York in the fifth-largest robbery in U.S. history. Four men, Samuel Millar, Father Patrick Moloney, former Rochester Police officer Thomas O'Connor, and Charles McCormick, all of whom have ties to the Provisional Irish Republican Army, are accused.
 January 19
IBM announces a $4,970,000,000 loss for 1992, the largest single-year corporate loss in United States history to date.
Iraq disarmament crisis: Iraq refuses to allow UNSCOM inspectors to use its own aircraft to fly into Iraq, and begins military operations in the demilitarized zone between Iraq and Kuwait, and the northern Iraqi no-fly zones. U.S. forces fire approximately forty Tomahawk cruise missiles at Baghdad factories linked to Iraq's illegal nuclear weapons program. Iraq then informs UNSCOM that it will be able to resume its flights.
 January 20 – Bill Clinton is sworn in as the 42nd President of the United States, and Al Gore is sworn in as the 45th Vice President of the United States.
 January 25 – Mir Aimal Kasi fires a rifle and kills two employees outside CIA headquarters in Langley, Virginia.
 January 31 – Super Bowl XXVII: The Buffalo Bills become the first team to lose three consecutive Super Bowls as they are defeated by the Dallas Cowboys, 52–17.

February 

 February 6 – Former tennis player Arthur Ashe, 49, dies of complications due to HIV in New York. Ashe was believed to have contracted the virus from a blood transfusion during a heart surgery ten years earlier.
 February 8 – General Motors Corporation sues NBC, after Dateline NBC allegedly rigged two crashes showing that some GM pickups can easily catch fire if hit in certain places. NBC settles the lawsuit the following day.
 February 11 – Janet Reno is selected by President Clinton as Attorney General of the United States.
 February 26 – 1993 World Trade Center bombing: In New York City, a van bomb parked below the North Tower of the World Trade Center explodes, killing six and injuring over 1,000.
 February 28 – Bureau of Alcohol, Tobacco and Firearms agents raid the Branch Davidian compound in Waco, Texas, with a warrant to arrest leader David Koresh on federal firearms violations. Four agents and five Davidian followers die in the raid and a 51-day standoff begins.

March 
 March 1-April 28 – An outbreak of Cryptosporidium protozoan affects Milwaukee, Wisconsin, infecting over 400,000 people, hospitalizing over 4,000, and killing at least 100, making it the largest waterborne disease outbreak in United States history.
 March 1 - The NFL introduces its current free agent system.
 March 4 – Authorities announce the capture of suspected World Trade Center bombing conspirator Mohammad Salameh.
 March 9 – Rodney King testifies at the federal trial of four Los Angeles, California police officers accused of violating his civil rights when they beat him during an arrest.
 March 11 – Janet Reno is confirmed by the United States Senate and sworn in the next day, becoming the first female Attorney General of the United States.
 March 13–14 – The Great Blizzard of 1993 strikes the eastern United States, bringing record snowfall and other severe weather all the way from Cuba to Quebec; the storm kills 318 people.
 March 22 – The Intel Corporation ships the first Pentium chips.
 March 29 – The 65th Academy Awards, hosted by Billy Crystal, are held at Dorothy Chandler Pavilion in Los Angeles, with Clint Eastwood's Unforgiven winning four awards, including Best Picture and Best Director. Both the film and James Ivory's Howards End lead the nominations with nine each. The telecast garners 45.7 million viewers.

April 

 April–May – A virus strikes the Four Corners, killing at least 13 people.
 April–October: The Great Flood of 1993: The Mississippi and Missouri Rivers flood large portions of the American Midwest.
 April 2 – The Adventures of Huck Finn, directed by Stephen Sommers and based on Mark Twain's 1884 novel of the same name, is released in theaters.
 April 9 – The rock band Nirvana plays a benefit concert for rape victims in war-torn Bosnia-Herzegovina at San Francisco's Cow Palace.
 April 13 – The Kuwaiti government claims to uncover an Iraqi assassination plot against former U.S. President George H. W. Bush shortly after his visit to Kuwait. Two Iraqi nationals confess to driving a car bomb into Kuwait on behalf of the Iraqi Intelligence Service.
 April 19 – A 51-day stand-off at the Branch Davidian compound near Waco, Texas, ends with a fire that kills 76 people, including David Koresh.
 April 28 – An executive order is issued requiring the United States Air Force to allow women to fly war planes.

May 
 May 1 – An outbreak of a respiratory illness later identified as hantavirus pulmonary syndrome begins in the southwestern United States; 32 patients die by the end of the year.
 May 3 – Rio Grande City in Texas officially incorporates into a city.
 May 5 – The West Memphis Three are three men who – while teenagers – were tried and convicted, in 1994, of the May 5, 1993 murders of three boys in West Memphis, Arkansas. Damien Echols was sentenced to death, Jessie Misskelley, Jr. was sentenced to life imprisonment plus two 20-year sentences, and Jason Baldwin was sentenced to life imprisonment. During the trial, the prosecution asserted that the children were killed as part of a Satanic ritual.
 May 20 – President Bill Clinton signs the National Voter Registration Act of 1993 into federal law.

June 
 June 5 – Minnesota v. Dickerson: The United States Supreme Court rules that the seizure of evidence during a pat-down search is constitutional.
 June 9 – The Montreal Canadiens win their 24th Stanley Cup, defeating the Los Angeles Kings in the Finals.
 June 11 – Jurassic Park, directed by Steven Spielberg, is released in theaters as the first film in the Jurassic Park saga.
 June 20 – John Paxson's 3-point shot in Game 6 of the NBA Finals helps the Chicago Bulls secure a 99–98 win over the Phoenix Suns, and their third consecutive championship.
 June 24 – A Unabomber bomb injures computer scientist David Gelernter at Yale University.
 June 27 – U.S. President Bill Clinton orders a cruise missile attack on Iraqi intelligence headquarters in the Al-Mansur District of Baghdad, in response to the attempted assassination of former U.S. President George H. W. Bush during his visit to Kuwait in mid-April.

July 
 July 1 – Gian Ferri kills eight and injures six before committing suicide at a law firm in San Francisco, sparking new legislative actions for gun control.
 July 19 – U.S. President Bill Clinton announces his 'Don't ask, don't tell' policy regarding homosexuals serving in the American military.
 July 15 – 1993 child sexual abuse accusations against Michael Jackson: Evan Chandler institutes legal accusations against singer Michael Jackson of sexually molesting Jordan Chandler, Evan's 13-year-old son.
 July 20 – White House deputy counsel Vince Foster dies by suicide in Virginia.
 July 25 – Greg Nicholson, his girlfriend and her two young daughters are murdered in Iowa by Dustin Honken and Angela Johnson. Nicholson was due to testify against Honken in court in relation to his drug activities.
 July 27 – Windows NT 3.1, the first version of Microsoft's line of Windows NT operating systems, is released to manufacturing.

August 
 August 1 – The Great Flood of 1993 comes to a peak.
 August 4 – A federal judge sentences LAPD officers Stacey Koon and Laurence Powell to 30 months in prison for violating motorist Rodney King's civil rights.
 August 10 
 Ruth Bader Ginsburg is sworn in as an Associate Justice of the Supreme Court.
 World Youth Day 1993 in Denver, Colorado. 
 August 21 – NASA loses contact with the Mars Observer spacecraft.
 August 28 – Mighty Morphin Power Rangers, the first Power Rangers entry, debuts on Fox Kids.

September 
 September 4 – The second World Parliament of Religions is held in Chicago.
 September 6 – Canadian software specialist Peter de Jager publishes an article titled "Doomsday 2000" in the U.S. weekly magazine Computerworld, which is the first known reference to Y2K – the Year 2000 problem.
 September 10 – Bill Nye the Science Guy first airs in syndication.
 September 13
 PLO leader Yasser Arafat and Israeli prime minister Yitzhak Rabin shake hands in Washington D.C., after signing a peace accord.
 Animaniacs makes its debut on Fox Kids.
 September 18 – Rocko's Modern Life makes its debut on Nickelodeon, becoming the network's fourth "Nicktoon" in the line-up.
 September 22 – Big Bayou Canot rail accident: An Amtrak Sunset Limited derails on a bridge which had been damaged by a barge near Mobile, Alabama. It is the deadliest train wreck in Amtrak's history.

October 
 October 3 – A large-scale battle erupts between U.S. forces and local militia in Mogadishu, Somalia; eighteen Americans and over 1,000 Somalis are killed.
 October 8 – David Miscavige announces the IRS has granted full tax exemption to the Church of Scientology International and affiliated churches and organizations, ending the Church's 40-year battle with the IRS and resulting in religious recognition in the United States.
 October 16 – U.S. President Bill Clinton sends six American warships to Haiti to enforce United Nations trade sanctions against their military-led regime.
 October 25 – Actor Vincent Price dies of lung cancer.
 October 31 – Actor River Phoenix dies of drug-induced heart failure on the sidewalk outside the West Hollywood nightclub The Viper Room.

November 
 November 11 – Microsoft releases Windows 3.11 for Workgroups to manufacturing.
 November 16 – President Bill Clinton signs the Religious Freedom Restoration Act of 1993 into federal law.
 November 18 – In a status referendum, Puerto Rico residents vote with a slim margin to maintain Commonwealth status.
 November 17–22 – The North American Free Trade Agreement (NAFTA) passes the legislative houses in the United States, Canada and Mexico.
 November 18 – The first meeting of the Asia-Pacific Economic Cooperation opens in Seattle.
 November 20 – Savings and loan crisis: The United States Senate Ethics Committee issues a stern censure of California senator Alan Cranston for his dealings with savings-and-loan executive Charles Keating.
 November 22 – TV Food Network makes its debut.
 November 30 – President Clinton signs the Brady Handgun Violence Prevention Act into law, requiring purchasers of handguns to pass a background check.

December 
 December
 The unemployment rate falls to 6.5%, the lowest since January 1991.
 ProCharger, an automotive aftermarket manufacturer is founded in Kansas.
 December 2 – STS-61: NASA launches the Space Shuttle Endeavour on a mission to repair an optical flaw in the Hubble Space Telescope.
 December 7
 Colin Ferguson opens fire with his Ruger 9 mm pistol on a Long Island Rail Road train, killing six and injuring 29.
 Avi Arad founds Marvel Studios.
 December 11 – A variety of Soviet space program paraphernalia are put to auction in Sotheby's New York, and sell for a total of US$6,800,000. One of the items is Lunokhod 1 and its spacecraft Luna 17; they sell for $68,500.

Ongoing 
 Iraqi no-fly zones (1991–2003)

Sport
February 23 - Sacramento Gold Miners are established as the First American franchise in the Canadian Football League
The Colorado Rockies and the Miami Marlins become baseball teams.

Births

January 

 January 3 – Kevin Ware, basketball player
 January 5 – De'Anthony Thomas, American football player
 January 8 – Brooke Greenberg, woman with rare slow-aging condition (d. 2013)
 January 9
 Ashley Argota, actress
 Marcus Peters, American football player
 January 13 – Tyler Barnhardt, actor
 January 15 – Wil Trapp, soccer player
 January 18 – Morgan York, actress
 January 19 – Zyon Cavalera drummer
 January 27 – Joe Landolina, inventor and entrepreneur
 January 29 – Lewis Pullman, actor

February 

 February 3 – Brandon Micheal Hall, actor
 February 7 – David Dorfman, actor
 February 12 
 Taylor Dearden, actress
 Sam Kazemian, Iranian-American software programmer, co-founder of Everipedia
 Jennifer Stone, actress
 February 14
 Shane Harper, actor and singer
 Alberto Rosende, actor
 February 18
 Kentavious Caldwell-Pope, basketball player
 Unbridled's Song, thoroughbred horse, winner of Breeders' Cup Juvenile (1995) (d. 2013)
 February 19
 Patrick Johnson, actor
 Victoria Justice, actress and singer
 February 25 – Timmy Hill, race car driver
 February 27 – Jessica Korda, golfer

March 

 March 3 – Nicole Gibbs, tennis player
 March 4
 Jenna Boyd, actress
 Abigail Mavity, actress
 March 5 – Josh Briggs, pro wrestler
 March 7 – Alex Broadhurst, ice hockey player
 March 10 – Peniel Shin, rapper and dancer (BTOB)
 March 11 – Anthony Davis, basketball player
 March 16 – Jericho, YouTuber and twitch streamer
 March 29 – Joe Adler, actor

April 

 April 2 – Aaron Kelly, singer
 April 10 – Sofia Carson, actress and singer
 April 12
Dorial Green-Beckham, American football player
Katelyn Pippy, actress
 April 13 – Hannah Marks, actress
 April 14 
 Vivien Cardone, actress
Kent Jones, rapper
Graham Phillips, actor
Ellington Ratliff, singer and actor
Burnell Taylor, singer
 April 15 – Madeleine Martin, television and voice actress
 April 16 
Mirai Nagasu, figure skater
Chance The Rapper, singer/songwriter
 April 25 – Alex Bowman, race car driver

May 

 May 2 – Jarred Brooks, mixed martial artist and current ONE Strawweright World Champion
 May 6 – Alex Preston, singer
 May 10 
 Spencer Fox, actor, musician, and singer
 Halston Sage, actress
 May 13 – Debby Ryan, actress and singer
 May 14 – Miranda Cosgrove, actress and singer
 May 18 – Kyle, rapper
 May 19 – Daisy Mallory, country singer
 May 20 – Caroline Zhang, figure skater
 May 21 – Laura Loomer, Alt-right politician
 May 23
 Andy Janovich, American football player
 Stephon Tuitt, American football player

June 

 June 1 – Sam Anas, ice hockey player
 June 4 – Adam Saleh, YouTuber
 June 5 – Tyre Nichols, victim of police brutality (died 2023)
 June 6 – Vic Mensa, rapper
 June 7
 Swae Lee, singer, rapper and songwriter
 Amanda Leighton, actress
 June 14 
 Gunna, rapper
 Ryan McCartan, actor and singer
 Sammy Watkins, American football player
 June 21 – Hungrybox, esports athlete
 June 22 
 Caydee Denney, pair skater
 Izzy Miller, musician
 June 26 – Ariana Grande, actress and singer
 June 29 – Lorenzo James Henrie, actor

July 

 July 1 – Raini Rodriguez, actress and singer
 July 5 – Hollie Cavanagh, British-American singer
 July 7
 Ally Brooke, singer
 Jackson Withrow, tennis player
 July 9
 Bret Loehr, actor
 DeAndre Yedlin, soccer player
 July 10 – Carlon Jeffery, actor
 July 18 – Casey Veggies, rapper and songwriter
 July 21 – Aaron Durley, baseball player
 July 23 – Lili Simmons, actress and model
 July 26
 Elizabeth Gillies, actress and singer
 Taylor Momsen, actress, musician, and model
 July 28
 Sammy Guevara, pro wrestler
 La'Porsha Renae, singer
 July 29 – Dak Prescott, American football player

August 

 August 2 – Manika, singer-songwriter 
 August 3 – Thomas Rawls, American football player
 August 7 – Francesca Eastwood, actress, model, and socialite
 August 9 – Rydel Lynch, singer and actress
 August 11 – Alyson Stoner, actress, dancer, and singer
 August 13 – Kevin Cordes, swimmer
 August 20 – MK Nobilette, singer
 August 22 – Dillon Danis, martial artist
 August 26 – Keke Palmer, actress and singer
 August 28 – Cody Frost, artist, tiger, hunk
 August 29 – Lucas Cruikshank, actor and YouTube personality

September 

 September 1 – Megan Nicole, singer-songwriter
 September 5 – Gage Golightly, actress
 September 6 – Famous Dex, rapper
 September 7 – Taylor Gray, actor and model
 September 10 – Sarah Logan, professional wrestler
 September 11 – Farrah Moan, drag queen and entertainer
 September 12 – Kelsea Ballerini, singer-songwriter
 September 14
 Ashley Caldwell, freestyle skier
 Blaire White, transgender YouTuber
 September 16
 Metro Boomin, record producer, songwriter, and DJ
 Bryson DeChambeau, golfer
 September 18 – Patrick Schwarzenegger, actor and model
 September 23 – Duke Johnson, American football player
 September 24
 Sonya Deville, professional wrestler
 Ben Platt, actor and singer
 September 25 – Zach Tyler Eisen, voice actor
 September 30 – Cameron Grimes, pro wrestler

October 

 October 2 – Tara Lynne Barr, actress
 October 6 
 Angus T. Jones, actor
 Jourdan Miller, actress
 Molly Quinn, actress
 October 8 – Saucy Santana, rapper
 October 9 
 Lauren Davis, tennis player
 Scotty McCreery, singer-songwriter and guitarist
 October 11 – Brandon Flynn, actor
 October 13 – Tiffany Trump, socialite and model
 October 14 – Charlie Kirk, conservative commentator
 October 17 – Witney Carson, dancer and choreographer
 October 19 – Hunter King, actress
 October 22 
 Josiah Jones, filmmaker
 Omer Adam, Israeli singer
 October 23 – Taylor Spreitler, actress
 October 26 – Drew Gooden, comedian
 October 27 – Troy Gentile, actor
 October 30 – Marcus Mariota, American football player

November 

 November 9 – Steven Taylor, cricketer
 November 12 – Mackensie Alexander, American football player
 November 16 – Pete Davidson, comedian
 November 27
 Hannah Brandt, ice hockey player
 Aubrey Peeples, actress and singer 
 November 28
 Shiann Darkangelo, ice hockey player
 Bryshere Y. Gray, actor and rapper
 November 29
 Stefon Diggs, American football player
 David Lambert, actor
 November 30 – Kevon Seymour, American football player

December 

 December 1 – Drakeo the Ruler, rapper (died 2021)
 December 2
 Amouranth, internet personality
 Dylan McLaughlin, actor
 December 3 – Marques Brownlee, YouTuber
 December 7 – Jasmine Villegas, singer
 December 8 – AnnaSophia Robb, actress
 December 10 – Joey Salads, YouTuber
 December 11 – Sonny Kiss, pro wrestler
 December 18 
 Byron Buxton, baseball player
 John Cihangir, actor, stuntman and YouTuber
 December 19 – Corey Snide, actor and dancer
 December 21 – Jinger Vuolo, author
 December 22
 Ali Lohan, actress and model
 Meghan Trainor, singer
 December 31 – Ryan Blaney, race car driver

Date Unknown 
 David Benoit, pro wrestler and son of Chris Benoit

Deaths

January

 January 1 
 Eddie Arning, American farming community (b. 1898)
 Jean Mayer, French-born American scientist (b. 1920)
 January 3
 Johnny Most, American sportscaster (b. 1923)
 Will Walls, American football player and coach (b. 1912)
 January 6 – Dizzy Gillespie, American musician, bandleader, singer and composer (b. 1917)
 January 10
 Diana Adams, American ballet dancer (b. 1926)
 Luther Gulick, expert on public administration (b. 1892)
 January 15
 Sammy Cahn, American lyricist (b. 1913)
 Henry Iba, American basketball coach and college athletics administrator (b. 1904)
 January 16
 Glenn Corbett, American actor (b. 1930)
 Freddie 'Red' Cochrane, American boxer; welterweight champion between 1941 and 1946 (b. 1915)
 Stan Sheriff, American football player, coach, and college athletics administrator (b. 1932)
 January 19
 Reginald Lewis, American businessman (b. 1942)
 Chris Street, American college basketball player (b. 1972)
 January 20 – Audrey Hepburn, Belgian-born British actress (b. 1929)
 January 21 – Charlie Gehringer, American baseball player (b. 1903)
 January 22 – Jim Pollard, American professional basketball player and coach (b. 1922)
 January 23
 Thomas A. Dorsey, American musician (b. 1899)
 Keith Laumer, American science fiction author (b. 1925)
 January 24 – Thurgood Marshall, American jurist, First African-American on the Supreme Court (b. 1908)
 January 25 – Bernard Joseph Smith, American marathon runner; winner of the 1942 Boston Marathon (b. 1917)
 January 27 – J. T. King, American football player, coach, and college athletics administrator (b. 1912)
 January 28 – Vern Kennedy, American MLB pitcher (b. 1907)
 January 29
 Gustav Hasford, American marine, novelist, journalist, poet and book thief (b. 1947)
 Ron Kostelnik, American football player in the National Football League (b. 1940)

February

 February 5 – Joseph L. Mankiewicz, American screenwriter and producer (b. 1909)
 February 6 – Arthur Ashe, American tennis player (b. 1943)
 February 7 – Buddy Pepper, American songwriter and accompanist (b. 1922)
 February 9 – Kate Wilkinson, American stage and television actress (b. 1916)
 February 11 
 Joy Garrett, American actor and vocalist (b. 1945)
 Robert W. Holley, American biochemist, Nobel Prize laureate (b. 1922)
 February 18 – Kerry Von Erich, American professional wrestler (b. 1960)
 February 23 – Phillip Terry, American actor (b. 1909)
 February 25 – Eddie Constantine, American-born French actor and singer (b. 1917)
 February 26 – Beaumont Newhall, American curator (b. 1908)
 February 27 – Lillian Gish, American actress (b. 1893)
 February 28 – Ruby Keeler, American actress (b. 1909)

March

 March 1 – Terry Frost, American actor (b. 1906)
 March 3 – Albert Sabin, American biologist, developer of the oral polio vaccine (b. 1906)
 March 4 – Izaak Kolthoff, Dutch-born American chemist (b. 1894)
 March 7
 Duane Carter, American racing driver (b. 1913)
 Whitey Kachan, American basketball player (b. 1925)
 Eleanor Sanger, American television producer (b. 1929)
 Jim Spavital, footballer (b. 1926)
 Earl Wrightson, American singer and actor (b. 1913)
 March 8 
 Don Barksdale, American basketball player (b. 1923)
 Billy Eckstine, American musician (b. 1914)
 March 9 – Max August Zorn, German-born mathematician (b. 1906)
 March 16 – Ralph Fults America outlaw (b. 1910)
 March 17 – Helen Hayes, American actress (b. 1900)
 March 20
 Percy Johnston,  African-American poet, playwright, and professor (b. 1930)
 Polykarp Kusch, German-born American physicist, Nobel Prize laureate (b. 1911)
 Paul László, Hungarian-born architect (b. 1900)
 March 22 – Steve Olin, American baseball player (b. 1965)
 March 23 – Tim Crews, American baseball player (b. 1961)
 March 24 – John Hersey, American writer and journalist (b. 1914)
 March 26 – Louis Falco, American dancer and choreographer (b. 1942)
 March 27 – Elizabeth Holloway Marston, American psychologist (b. 1893)
 March 30 – Richard Diebenkorn, American painter (b. 1922)
 March 31
 Brandon Lee, American actor and martial artist, son of Bruce Lee (b. 1965)
 Mitchell Parish, American lyricist (b. 1900)

April

 April 1 – Alan Kulwicki, U.S. race car driver (b. 1954)
 April 3
 Peter J. De Muth, American politician (b. 1892)
 Pinky Lee, American comedian (b. 1907)
 April 8 – Marian Anderson, American singer (b. 1897)
 April 13 – Wallace Stegner, American writer (b. 1909)
 April 19 – David Koresh, American spiritualist, leader of the Branch Davidian religious cult (b. 1959)
 April 23 – Cesar Chavez, Mexican American civil rights activist (b. 1927)
 April 26 – Julia Davis, American educator (b. 1891)
 April 28 – Jim Valvano, American basketball player (b. 1946)

May

 May 5 – Irving Howe, American literary and social critic (b. 1920)
 May 7 – Mary Philbin, American actress (b. 1902)
 May 8
 Avram Davidson, American writer (b. 1923)
 Alwin Nikolais, American choreographer (b. 1912)
 May 14 – William Randolph Hearst, Jr., American businessman (b. 1908)
 May 26 – Catherine Caradja, Romanian aristocrat and philanthropist (b. 1893)
 May 30 – Sun Ra, American jazz musician (b. 1914)

June

 June 2 – Johnny Mize, American baseball player (b. 1913)
 June 5 – Conway Twitty, American musician (b. 1933)
 June 6 – James Bridges, American screenwriter and director (b. 1936)
 June 8 – Nolan Bailey Harmon, bishop of The Methodist Church and the United Methodist Church (b. 1892)
 June 9 – Alexis Smith, Canadian-born American actress and singer (b. 1921)
 June 10
 Arleen Auger, American soprano singer (b. 1939)
 Milward L. Simpson, American politician (b. 1897)
 June 13 – Deke Slayton, American astronaut (b. 1924)
 June 15 – John Connally, American politician (b. 1917)
 June 19 – Szymon Goldberg, Polish-born violinist (b. 1909)
 June 22 – Pat Nixon, wife of Richard Nixon, First Lady of the United States, Second Lady of the United States (b. 1912)
 June 24 – Archie Williams, American Olympic athlete (b. 1915)
 June 26 – Roy Campanella, American baseball player (b. 1921)
 June 28 – GG Allin, American musician (b. 1956)
 June 30 – Spanky McFarland, American actor (b. 1928)

July

 July 2 
 Fred Gwynne, American actor and comedian (b. 1926)
 Elizabeth M. Ramsey, American research physician (b. 1906)
 July 3
 Don Drysdale, American baseball player (b. 1936)
 Joe DeRita, American comedian (b. 1909)
 July 4 – Anne Shirley, American actress (b. 1918)
 July 7
 William McElwee Miller, American missionary to Persia and author (b. 1892)
 Mia Zapata, American punk musician (b. 1965)
 July 12 – James Peck, American civil rights activist (b. 1914)
 July 13 – Davey Allison, American stock car driver (b. 1961)
 July 15 – David Brian, American actor (b. 1914)
 July 24 – Abram L. Sachar, American historian and educator (b. 1899)
 July 25
 Nan Grey, American actress (b. 1918)
 Cecilia Parker, American actress (b. 1914)
 July 26 – Matthew Ridgway, American army general (b. 1895)
 July 27 – Reggie Lewis, American basketball player (b. 1965)
 July 30
 William Guglielmo Niederland, German-born American psychoanalyst (b. 1904)
 Bob Wright, American baseball player (b. 1891)
 July 31 – Paul B. Henry, American politician (b. 1942)

August

 August 1 – Claire Du Brey, American actress (b. 1892)
 August 3 – Theodore A. Parker III, American ornithologist (b. 1953)
 August 7 – Christopher Gillis, American dancer and choreographer (b. 1951)
 August 10 – Irene Sharaff, American costume designer (b. 1910)
 August 16 – Stewart Granger, Anglo-American actor (b. 1913)
 August 26 − Roy Raymond, American entrepreneur (b. 1947)
 August 30 – Richard Jordan, American actor (b. 1937)

September

 September 2 – Eric Berry, British actor (b. 1913)
 September 3 – Wesley Englehorn, American football player (b. 1890)
 September 4 – Hervé Villechaize, French-born actor (b. 1943)
 September 9 – Helen O'Connell, American singer (b. 1920)
 September 12
 Raymond Burr, Canadian-American actor (b. 1917)
 Charles Lamont, Russian-born film director (b. 1895)
 September 13 – Steve Jordan, American jazz guitarist (b. 1919)
 September 22
 Maurice Abravanel, Greek-born American conductor (b. 1903)
 Regina Fryxell, American composer (b. 1899)
 September 27 – Jimmy Doolittle, American aviation pioneer and World War II United States Army Air Forces general (b. 1896)
 September 28 – Alexander A. Drabik, American soldier (b. 1910)
 September 29 – Gordon Douglas, American film director (b. 1907)

October

 October 5 – Agnes de Mille, American dancer and choreographer (b. 1905)
 October 12 – Leon Ames, American actor (b. 1903)'
 October 13 – Ruth Gilbert, American actress (b. 1912)
 October 17 – Criss Oliva, American metal guitarist (b. 1963)
 October 21 – James Leo Herlihy, American novelist and playwright (b. 1927)
 October 25 – Vincent Price, American actor (b. 1911)
 October 26 – Harold Rome, American composer (b. 1908)
 October 31 – River Phoenix, American actor, musician and activist (b. 1970)

November

 November 1 – Severo Ochoa, Spanish-born biochemist, recipient of the Nobel Prize in Physiology or Medicine (b. 1905)
 November 6 – Ralph Randles Stewart, American botanist (b. 1890)
 November 12
 Bill Dickey, American baseball player (b. 1907)
 H. R. Haldeman, 4th White House Chief of Staff (b. 1926)
 Anna Sten, Ukrainian-born American actress (b. 1908)
 November 13 – Rufus R. Jones, American wrestler (b. 1933)
 November 15 – Evelyn Venable, American actress (b. 1913)
 November 20 – Emile Ardolino, American film director (b. 1943)
 November 21 – Bill Bixby, American actor (b. 1934)
 November 24 – Albert Collins, African-American blues guitarist and singer (b. 1932)
 November 28 – Garry Moore, American television host and comedian (b. 1915)

December

 December 4 – Frank Zappa, American guitarist and composer (b. 1940)
 December 6 – Don Ameche, American actor (b. 1908)
 December 14 – Myrna Loy, American actress (b. 1905)
 December 16
 Charles Willard Moore, American architect (b. 1926)
 Moses Gunn, American actor (b. 1929)
 December 17 – Janet Margolin, American actress (b. 1943)
 December 18 – Sam Wanamaker, American film director and actor (b. 1919)
 December 19 – Michael Clarke, American musician (b. 1946)
 December 20 – W. Edwards Deming, American engineer, professor, author, lecturer, and management consultant (b. 1900)
 December 21 – Gussie Nell Davis, American educator and founder of the Kilgore College Rangerettes (b. 1906)
 December 22
 Don DeFore, American actor (b. 1917)
 Alexander Mackendrick, British-American film director (b. 1912)
 December 23 – James Ellison, American actor (b. 1910)
 December 24 – Norman Vincent Peale, American preacher and writer (b. 1898)
 December 28
 William L. Shirer, American journalist and historian (b. 1904)
 Howard Caine, American actor (b. 1926)
 December 31
 Brandon Teena, American murder victim (b. 1972)
 Thomas Watson Jr., American businessman, political figure, and philanthropist (b. 1914)

See also 
 1993 in American television
 List of American films of 1993
 Timeline of United States history (1990–2009)

References

External links 
 

 
1990s in the United States
United States
United States
Years of the 20th century in the United States